Bedouin music is the music of nomadic Bedouin Arab tribes in the Arabian Peninsula, North Africa, Mesopotamia and the Levant. It is closely linked to its text and poems. Songs are based on poetry and are sung either unaccompanied, or to the stringed instrument, the rebab. Traditional instruments are the rebab and various woodwinds. Examples of Bedouin music are the Samri of Saudi Arabia, Aita of Morocco, and the internationally recognised Rai of Algeria.

References

External links 
Bulletin Campbell

 
Arabic music
Middle Eastern music
North African music
Saudi Arabian music
Algerian music 
Sudanese music
Raï